WMTN (93.3 FM, "Classic Country 93.3") is a radio station broadcasting a classic country music format. Licensed to Morristown, Tennessee, United States, the station is currently owned by Radio Acquisition Corp. and features programming from AP Radio and Motor Racing Network.

FM Translator
In addition to the main (originating) station on 1300 AM, WMTN is heard on 93.3 MHz via an FM translator:

References

External links
 

 Radio Locator Information on W227DH

Country radio stations in the United States
MTN
Morristown, Tennessee